Giovinco Ice Piedmont is an ice piedmont,  wide, between Canyon Glacier and Perez Glacier, gradually descending north to the Ross Ice Shelf, Antarctica. It was named by the Advisory Committee on Antarctic Names for Frank A. Giovinco, Master of the USNS Private John R. Towle during U.S. Navy Operation Deep Freeze 1965. Frank Giovinco's nephew is the fine art photographer and artist Steve Giovinco, whose work is loosely related to environmental changes.

References

Ice piedmonts of Antarctica
Dufek Coast
Bodies of ice of the Ross Dependency